Salminus brasiliensis (dourado, dorado, golden dorado, river tiger or jaw characin) is a large, predatory characiform freshwater fish found in central and east-central South America. Despite having Salminus in its name, the dorado is not related to any species of salmon, nor to the saltwater fish also called dorado. It is very popular among recreational anglers and supports large commercial fisheries.

Name
"Dorado", both in the name of the fish and other uses such as the El Dorado legend, originates from the Latin word for gold, auratus (later modified into dauratus in Vulgar Latin, and subsequently oro in Spanish and ouro in Portuguese).

The Portuguese word dourado and Spanish dorado both mean "golden" and is applied to the fish due to its color displaying golden reflections.

Description
The golden dorado has a large head, with powerful jaws filled with sharp teeth. Adults are yellow-golden in color, but juveniles are more silvery. Immatures (to a lesser extent adults) resemble Brycon hilarii and Salminus hilarii. Females grow considerably larger than males, but otherwise the sexes are similar. It is the largest scaled freshwater fish in the Río de la Plata Basin (the only fish that can surpass it  in size are certain river stingrays and catfish; both scaleless).

Distribution, habitat and life cycle

The golden dorado is native to warm freshwater habitats in southern Brazil, Paraguay, Uruguay, Bolivia and northern Argentina. Here it inhabits the Paraguay (including the Pantanal), Paraná, Uruguay, Chapare, Mamoré and Guaporé River basins, and the drainage of the Lagoa dos Patos. Outside its native range, the golden dorado has been introduced to several southeast Brazilian river basins, notably Doce, Paraíba do Sul, Iguazu and Guaraguaçu.

Other South American river basins hold relatives of this species: S. franciscanus in the São Francisco Basin, S. hilarii in the upper Paraná, Amazon and Orinoco basins, and S. affinis in the Santiago and Magdalena basins in Ecuador and Colombia.

It is generally a solitary species, but migrates in groups. The females reach maturity when 4–5 years old and can lay up to 2 million eggs, which are released near the water surface. Golden dorados can reach an age of more than 15 years.

Diet

The golden dorado is the apex predator in its freshwater habitat. They are primarily piscivores, eating a wide variety of fish, but have also been recorded feeding on large insects, crustaceans and small vertebrates (for example, rodents, lizards and birds). One of the adult dorado's favorite prey is the streaked prochilod (Prochilodus lineatus), a species of schooling fish that also is migratory.

In the larval stage, golden dorados feed on plankton. As they grow larger, they switch to insects and small fish. In contrast, adult dorados have been known to eat Brycon hilarii.

Status
The golden dorado has declined because of overfishing and dams, which restricts its breeding migration. It is listed as a threatened species in Rio Grande do Sul in Brazil and in Paraguay; in the latter country, a five-year fishing ban was put into effect.

In contrast, the golden dorado has been introduced for fishing to several rivers outside its native range. Being a large highly predatory species, this represents a serious threat to the native fish in these rivers.

Fishing

The golden dorado is highly sought-after by anglers, both for its appreciated meat and its fighting ability. The aggressive nature of the dorado, its high jumps, fighting strength and stamina have created a competitive market among anglers from all corners of the world, traversing South American waters in hopes of hooking a dorado.

From the 2000s onwards, the dorado has been increasingly recognized as a fly-fishing targeted species. Its aggressive behavior and initiative taking flies as an active predator, paired with great fight energy, frequently going airborne in the attempt to loosen itself from the hook, make this species a true gamefish.

This fish usually takes flies both on surface and sub-surface and anglers tend to make use of heavier fly tackle (#6 and up, reaching #12 in some places) for placing bulky flies which are seen to be more attractive for the Dorado.

Also often used by fly fishermen are Intermediate and Sinking-Tip fly lines once the species feeds on fast currents.
The Dorado is an avid hunter but can be a lazy chaser. Anglers make use of either very slow or very fast movement of the flies to spark attacks by the dorado, depending on the region and season, denoting a gregarious behavior and ambush feeding strategy. It would not move after prey and attack passing-by fish or react only when the prey are in deliberate attempt to escape.

Shiny, flashy material is very attractive to this fish, which led to the development of flies with much shiny, colorful material, or in opposition, dark or black ones suggesting lesser visual accuracy of the species.

Fly fishermen use minnow-like flies, streamers and other fish-imitating flies, but the preference of the fish for big-sized flies that swim below the surface originated a specific pattern - the Andino Deceiver.

Due to the Dorado's very sharp teeth, anglers use steel wire or fluorocarbon monofilament bite tippets, to avoid the fish cutting the line.

References

Fish of South America
Fish of Brazil
Fish of Bolivia
Fish of Argentina
Fish of Paraguay
Fish of Uruguay
Taxa named by Georges Cuvier
Fish described in 1816
Characidae